A staircase, or stairs, is a structure used to bridge a vertical distance.

Staircase may also refer to:

Music
 Staircase (album), by Keith Jarrett, 1977
 "The Staircase (Mystery)", a song by Siouxsie and the Banshees, 1979
 "The Daily Mail" / "Staircase", a single by Radiohead, 2011
 "Staircase", a song by Roni Size & Reprazent from In the Møde, 2000

Theater, film, and television
 Staircase (play), a 1968 play by Charles Dyer
 Staircase (film), a 1969 British film adaptation of the play
 The Staircase (1950 film), a West German drama film
 The Staircase (1998 film), an American television film
 The Staircase, a 2004 French true-crime TV miniseries documenting the murder trial of Michael Peterson
 The Staircase (miniseries), a 2022 American streaming miniseries adaptation of the French series

Places
 Staircase Falls, a series of waterfalls in Yosemite National Park, California, US
 Staircase Glacier, Antarctica
 Staircase Peak, or Skyang Kangri, a mountain on the China-Pakistan border

Other uses
 The Staircase (novel), a 2000 novel by Ann Rinaldi
 Staircase House, a medieval building in Stockport, Greater Manchester, England
 The shape of a mathematical function or model; see, e.g., staircase function and staircase number
 A type of student accommodation around Oxbridge university quadrangles; see, e.g., Tom Quad#Description
 "Hudson Yards Staircase", a name once used for Vessel (structure)

See also
 
 Stair (disambiguation)
 Staircasing (disambiguation)
 Stairway (disambiguation)
 Step (disambiguation)